Myriam Korfanty (born 1978) is a French team handball player. She competed at the 2000 Summer Olympics in Sydney, where the French team placed sixth. She also competed at the 2004 Summer Olympics in Athens, where France placed fourth.

References

External links

1978 births
Living people
French female handball players
Olympic handball players of France
Handball players at the 2000 Summer Olympics
Handball players at the 2004 Summer Olympics